The After film series consists of American romantic-dramas based on the Anna Todd authored After novels. The plot centers around the positive and negative experiences of a romantic relationship between a young couple named Tessa and Hardin. Over the events of their courtship, the pair overcome their various differences, all while strengthening the plans of building a future together.

Though the films have been met with negative reviews from critics, the movies have attained a fanbase and fared well financially. Their monetary successes have led the associated production studios to green-light production on multiple installments at the same time.

The series is continuing with a sequel in post production, as well as another sequel and prequel being concurrently in development.

Films

After (2019)

Tessa prides herself as an accomplished dedicated student and responsible daughter, and has always been a loyal girlfriend to her high school boyfriend. When she ventures away to college however, this is all called into question when she meets a brooding and mysterious guy named Hardin. Through an eventful series of romantic encounters, Tessa questions what she believed, her character, and what she wants in her future.

After We Collided (2020)

Following a passionate start to their relationship, Tessa and Hardin have experienced tumultuous differences, and an on-off series of courtships. Despite this the pair repeatedly return to each other, believing that their love has helped them to find a pathway to building a lasting relationship. Though Hardin can be mean, Tessa is drawn to him. Hardin struggles to work through his dark familial past, and in managing his anger issues. As his life experiences come to light, Tessa questions their future together. When she crashes her car following an argument, Hardin begins to believe he will only bring her harm.

After We Fell (2021)

When Tessa's alcoholic absent-father re-enters her life, she and Hardin try to develop a relationship with him. As Tessa plans to move away for a job opportunity, the pair's relationship once again grows strained. As they drift apart they begin to explore romantic interests in other people, all while becoming jealous of each other's potential suitors. Though they consider other options, they eventually reconcile. As they decide to get back together, revelations of Hardin's true family lead the couple on a new adventure.

After Ever Happy (2022)

Though they have had a variety of difficulties throughout their relationship, Tessa and Hardin find their love has only grown stronger. When they discover that they both have secrets regarding their respective families and upbringings, they realize that they're not so different as they had initially thought. Their time together has balanced each of their strengths and weaknesses; Tessa is no longer the simple good girl and Hardin has overcome his cruel rigid exterior. Despite this, they continue to work through their new differences, while determined to create a family together.

After Everything (2023)

In August 2022, it was announced that production was completed on a secret sequel to the film series. Though no details were revealed, it was stated that the film's title and that principal photography had recently wrapped. Langford and Fiennes Tiffin will reprise their roles as Tessa Young and Hardin Scott, respectively.

Future
In April 2021, it was announced that two additional installments in the After film series were in development. Both a prequel and a sequel are scheduled to film back-to-back beginning in the fall of 2021. The films will be written and directed by Castille Landon. In June of the same year, the filmmaker stated that she would continue work on the film series after first completing principal photography on an original script centered around a MMA love story.

 Before (TBA)

Based on the novella of the same name, the plot will revolve around Hardin Scott's life before he met Tessa Young. The project will detail a "larger conversation", with a more expanded plot including the character's trauma and family life. As the film will portray the character at a younger age, Hero Fiennes Tiffin will not reprise the role.

 Untitled sequel (TBA)

Inspired by the details of the epilogue from After Every Happy, the plot will center around the next-generation of the Scott family. The primary characters of the film will be Emery and Auden Scott, and their cousin Addy. Hardin and Tessa will feature into the plot, though as supporting characters as the parents of Emery and Auden; while Tiffin and Langford will not reprise the respective roles. Writer/director Landon stated the film will explore "carry[ing] the sins of [the] parents...trying to break out of that." Though the story will have less source material than the previous adaptations the filmmaker stated that it will "stay truthful" to past installments.

Main cast and characters

Additional crew and production details

Reception

Box office and financial performance

Critical and public response

References 

Film series based on American novels
Romance film series
Drama film series